Teams made up of athletes representing different National Olympic Committees (NOCs), called mixed-NOCs teams, participated in the 2016 Winter Youth Olympics. These teams participated in either events composed entirely of mixed-NOCs teams, or in events which saw the participation of mixed-NOCs teams and non-mixed-NOCs teams. When a mixed-NOCs team won a medal, the Olympic flag was raised rather than a national flag; if a mixed-NOCs team won gold, the Olympic anthem would be played instead of national anthems. A total of 6 events with Mixed NOCs were held.

Background 
The concept of mixed-NOCs was introduced in the 2010 Summer Youth Olympics, in which athletes from different nations would compete in the same team, often representing their continent. This is in contrast to the Mixed team (IOC code: ZZX) found at early senior Olympic Games.

Medal summary 
The following medal summary lists all nations whose athletes won a medal while competing for a mixed-NOCs team. If there is more than one athlete from the same nation on a medal-winning team, only one medal of that colour is credited. The summary shows how many events at which a nation had an athlete in a medal-winning mixed-NOCs team.

A total of 25 National Olympic Committees, had at least one athlete representing a mixed-NOCs team win a medal.

Curling

Athletes from the mixed team event were paired off to form a doubles team containing one boy and one girl. In total 32 mixed NOCs teams were formed.

Figure skating

Athletes from the four figure skating events were placed to form a team trophy containing one boy, one girl, one pair and one ice dancing. In total 8 mixed NOCs teams were formed.

Luge

Athletes from the three individual sled events were placed to form a team containing one boy, one girl and one doubles sled. Nations without a full team were able to form mixed NOCs teams. In total 1 mixed NOCs team was formed.

Short track speed skating

Athletes from the individual events were placed to form a team containing two boys and two girls. In total 8 mixed NOCs teams were formed.

Snowboarding

Athletes which participated in the ski and snowboard cross were placed to form a team containing one snowboard cross girl, one ski cross girl, one snowboard cross boy and one ski cross boy. Nations without a full team were able to form mixed NOCs teams. In total 5 mixed NOCs teams were formed.

Speed skating

Athletes from the individual events were placed to form a team containing two boys and two girls. In total 13 mixed NOCs teams were formed.

See also
 2016 Winter Youth Olympics medal table
 Mixed-NOCs at the Youth Olympics

References

2016 Winter Youth Olympics
Mixed teams at the Youth Olympics